Le Breuil-sous-Argenton is a village and former commune in the Deux-Sèvres department in western France. On 1 January 2016, it was merged into the new commune Argentonnay, and became a delegated commune of Argentonnay. It is situated in the northeastern part of the commune.

Geography
The delegated commune of Le Breuil-sous-Argenton has an area of 19.6 km² and 478 inhabitants in 2019. The commune bordered the communes of Saint-Aubin-du-Plain, Coulonges-Thouarsais and Genneton. It has an average elevation of 118 metres, and the main river is the Argenton.

Landmarks
The principal church in the village is the Église Notre-Dame.

The late Gothic-style , to the north of the village, dates to the 15th century and was listed as a Historical Monument in 1898. In the 18th century it was damaged following a fire during the French Revolution. Meaning "white thorn", its four towers remain mostly intact and it has a partially filled moat. In 2018, a crowdfunding project organized by startup Dartagnans.fr was started with the objective of restoring the medieval chateau to its former splendour and installing stables, wood and stone workshops, a blacksmith's forge, and a medieval tavern and hostel.

Notable people
Henri-Victor Miault (1881-1932), sculptor, decorator and carver

See also
Communes of the Deux-Sèvres department

References

Former communes of Deux-Sèvres
Populated places disestablished in 2016